Iván Hernández Dala (born 18 May 1966) is the current head of Directorate General of Military Counterintelligence (DGCIM) and head of the Venezuelan Presidential Honor Guard.

2019 Venezuelan uprising
During the 2019 Venezuelan uprising, Hernández Dala was named as a potential high-ranking official who allegedly met with those plotting to overthrow Nicolás Maduro.

International sanctions
As being head of DGCIM, an institution accused of torturing and imprisoning opponents of Nicolas Maduro, Hernández Dala was sanctioned by the European Union in June 2018, Switzerland on 10 July 2018, the United States in February 2019 and Canada on 15 April 2019.

See also 

 International sanctions during the Venezuelan crisis

References

1966 births
People from Caracas
Venezuelan military personnel
Living people